is an anime television series by Tatsunoko Productions. that originally ran from October 1969 to September 1970, with a total of 52 episodes on Fuji TV. It tells the story of a boy who finds a bottle with a mysterious power - each time its user sneezes or yawns, a genie will come up and must grant the user's wish. A 1992 Saban Entertainment English dub called Bob In A Bottle was shown internationally and a remake was shown in 2020.

Plot
An old bottle has found its way into the household of a family, where an elementary school student named Kan, his parents, and a pet bulldog lived. A genie, Hakushon, and his daughter, Akubi, reside inside it. When Kan finds the bottle, he discovers that a sneeze summons Hakushon and he must grant the wish of whoever sneezed, while a yawn summons Akubi and she must do the same for whoever yawned. Getting wishes granted by either genie may not be a good thing, for Hakushon messes them up due to his own extreme clumsiness, while the more capable Akubi likes to cause mischief by twisting their words and meanings so that something bad happens.

Localization
The series was dubbed in English by Saban Entertainment in 1992 under the name Bob in a Bottle. A reggae-style theme song was composed for this version. Hakushon, Akubi and Kan were renamed "Bob", "Illana" and "Joey" respectively. Later, Bob in a Bottle was aired in Spanish, German, French, Swedish, Danish, and Hebrew. The English version aired in the United States on PRISM from 1994 to 1995, and also aired on Canada's YTV, Kenya's KTN, Australia's Seven Network in 1992, Zimbabwe's ZBC TV, New Zealand's TV2 in 1994, and the Netherlands' TV10. The motto for the English version is "Make everyday like paradise" and "You sneeze, I please, that's the way it goes". It was shown in Latin America under the name Yam Yam y el Genio, in Italy under the name "Il Mago Pancione Etcì" and in Arabic speaking countries as El Fatah Borhan.

The English dub of the series was considered lost until April 2020 when a YouTube channel on the history of English anime dubs by the name of Yui-Senpai TV discovered that all episodes of the dub have been preserved on videocassette copies in the Library of Congress. On December 28, 2021, a YouTube channel by the name of TVFourgade discovered that the tapes being held in the Library of Congress are on the U-matic tape format. According to the librarian, the tapes are in decent condition, with some visual noise on one of the tapes. Since 2022, a YouTube channel by the name of FilmwaysVTC has been uploading full episodes of the show taken from syndicated airings on Seven Network in 1992.

2020 Remake
A new anime television series by Tatsunoko Production and Nippon Animation aired on ytv from April 11, 2020, to September 26, 2020. It is a sequel series that takes place 50 years after the end of the original anime and centers on Akubi and Kantarō, the grandson of the original anime's protagonist. Atsushi Nigorikawa directed the series, with Hiroko Kanasugi handling series composition, Shin Takemoto and Masatsune Noguchi designed the characters, and Takamitsu Shimazaki, Hiroshi Sasaki, and Teppei Shimizu composed the series' music. On May 24, 2020, it was announced that episode 8 and further episodes would be delayed to June 20 due to the COVID-19 pandemic. Viz Media licensed the series as Genie Family 2020 and released it on Crunchyroll on October 15, 2020. The anime is also available on Roku, Peacock and Tubi.

Cast

Japanese version (1969)
Hakushon Daimaō - Tōru Ōhira
Akubi - Takako Sasuga
Daidaimaō - Ichirō Nagai
Shakkuri-sensei - Hisako Kyōda
Kan - Midori Katō
Daddy - Isamu Tanonaka
Mommy - Mitsuko Asō
Gejigon - Kazuya Tatekabe
Yuriko - Minori Matsushima
Burukō - Tarō Sagami
Sorekara-ojisan - Kinya Aikawa

Japanese version (2020)
Hakushon Daimaō - Kōichi Yamadera
Akubi - Sumire Morohoshi
Kantarō Yodayama - Miyuri Shimabukuro
Pūta - Daiki Yamashita

English version
Bob - Gary Jewell
Joey - Sonja Ball
Mr. Carter - Richard Dumont
Mrs. Carter/Chauncey - Jane Woods
Llana - Liz MacRae
Tilly - A.J. Henderson
Dora/Miss Green - Kathleen Fee
Additional Voices - Terrence Scammell, Mark Hellman, Pauline Little, Arthur Holden, Aron Tager, Bronwen Mantel

Spinoffs
The Hakushon Daimaō franchise made a comeback in the 2000s with two animated spinoff series produced by Tatsunoko and directed by Hiroshi Sasagawa, featuring Akubi as the central character and Hakushon as a supporting character.

Yobarete Tobedete! Akubi-chan

In Yobarete, Tobidete! Akubi-chan (26 episodes, 2001–2002), Akubi (now voiced by Asuka Tanii) befriends a shy young girl named Koron Nemuta (voiced by Sakura Nogawa), who habitually yawns whenever she is embarrassed, thus summoning Akubi forth from the bottle.

Akubi Girl

In 2006's Akubi Girl (also 26 episodes), Akubi befriends a first-grader named Ruru-chan and attempts to grant her wish of becoming close friends with Itoshi-kun, the boy on whom she has a secret crush.

Crossover
Pandora to Akubi, an anime film crossover between The Genie Family and Monster Strike was released on April 5, 2019.

Other appearances
A statue of Hakushon Daimaō can be seen in the first episode of the 2008 series of Yatterman.
Hakushon Daimaō is featured as a playable character in the Japan-exclusive fighting game Tatsunoko vs. Capcom: Cross Generation of Heroes in December 2008, though due to licensing issues, he was not featured in the second iteration, Tatsunoko vs. Capcom: Ultimate All-Stars, which was released internationally.
A brief reference to the series is made in the Mighty Morphin' Power Rangers episode "A Bad Reflection on You" in which clips from the English intro (Bob in a Bottle) are shown on a miniature television. Bulk (portrayed by Paul Schrier) states that it is his favorite cartoon. Music from the show, accompanied by visuals of Around the World in 80 Dreams (another Saban cartoon), also appeared at the end of the season 2 episode "The Power Stealer", where Skull (portrayed by Jason Narvy) enjoys watching.

References

External links 
 
 
 Official 2020 anime website
 "Bob in a Bottle" / "Hakushon Daimao" - English Dub History Episode 1, Yui-senpai TV Youtube

1969 anime television series debuts
1970 Japanese television series endings
2001 anime television series debuts
2006 anime television series debuts
2020 anime television series debuts
Anime postponed due to the COVID-19 pandemic
Anime productions suspended due to the COVID-19 pandemic
Anime with original screenplays
Comedy anime and manga
Fox Kids
Fuji TV original programming
Genies in television
Japanese children's animated comedy television series
Nippon Animation
Television series by Saban Entertainment
Seven Network original programming
TVNZ 2 original programming
Tatsunoko Production
Viz Media anime
Yomiuri Telecasting Corporation original programming
YTV (Canadian TV channel) original programming